Herbert Ernest Saxon Bertie Cordey Lyon (18 May 1875 – 1927), known as Bertie or Bert Lyon, was an English footballer. Although predominantly an inside forward or centre forward, Mosborough-born Lyon played in most positions throughout his career. He never stayed at the same club for more than two consecutive seasons; during his career he played for Overseal Town, Gresley Rovers, Leicester Fosse, Nelson, Watford, Reading, West Ham United, Brighton & Hove Albion, Swindon Town, Carlisle United, Blackpool, Walsall and Tredegar.

Lyon joined Leicester Fosse from Gresley Rovers in January 1899. He was once selected to play a Football League First Division match as a goalkeeper, against Bolton Wanderers in March 1900, and kept a clean sheet in a goalless draw.

After a season at Nelson, of the Lancashire League, Lyon moved south to Hertfordshire, to play for Southern League First Division side Watford. He finished the 1901–02 season as the club's leading scorer, with 14 goals from 32 appearances; however, he departed at the end of the season. Indeed, between 1901 and 1909, he spent precisely one season at a club before moving on; namely Watford (1901–02), Reading (1902–03), West Ham (1903–04), Brighton & Hove Albion (1904–05), Swindon Town (1905–06 and 1907–08), Carlisle United (1906–07) and Blackpool (1908–1909).

References
Specific

1875 births
1927 deaths
People from Mosborough
Footballers from Derbyshire
English footballers
Association football inside forwards
Leicester City F.C. players
Nelson F.C. players
Watford F.C. players
Reading F.C. players
West Ham United F.C. players
Brighton & Hove Albion F.C. players
Swindon Town F.C. players
Carlisle United F.C. players
Blackpool F.C. players
Walsall F.C. players
Gresley F.C. players
English Football League players
Southern Football League players